The 1929 Pacific Tigers football team represented the College of the Pacific—now known as the University of the Pacific—in Stockton, California as a member of the Far Western Conference (FWC) during the 1929 college football season. The team was led by ninth-year head coach Erwin Righter, and played home games at Baxter Stadium in Stockton. Pacific compiled an overall record of 3–4–1 with a mark of 1–3–1 in conference play, tying for fourth place in the FWC. The Tigers were outscored by their opponents 88 to 67 for the season.

Schedule

References

Pacific
Pacific Tigers football seasons
Pacific Tigers football